The 2nd Guards Cavalry Division was a Guards light cavalry division of the Imperial Russian Army.

Organisation
1857–1918:
1st Cavalry Brigade
Horse Grenadier Life-Guards Regiment
Her Majesty's Lancer Guards Regiment 
2nd Cavalry Brigade
Dragoon Guards Regiment 
His Majesty's Hussar Guards Regiment)
2nd Division Life-Guards Horse Artillery

Commanders
1882–1884: Aleksandr Puzyrevskii
1886–1890: Victor Fedorovitch Winberg
1901–1905: Georgi Skalon
1906–1909: Aleksei Brusilov
1912-1914: Georgy Ottonovich Rauch

Commanders of the 1st Brigade
1913–1914: Sergei Belosselsky-Belozersky

Commanders of the 2nd Brigade
1873–1874: Illarion Ivanovich Vorontsov-Dashkov
1896–1898: Sergei Vasilchikov

Chiefs of Staff
1866–1875: Kazimir Vasilevich Levitsky
1902: Andrei Zayonchkovski
1909—1914 : Afrikan P. Bogaewsky

References

Russian Imperial Guard
Cavalry divisions of the Russian Empire
Military units and formations established in 1810
Military units and formations disestablished in 1918